Ekhard Karl Hermann Salje, FRS (born 1946) is an Emeritus Professor, and formerly Professor of Mineralogy and Petrology and Head of the Department of Earth Sciences, Cambridge University.

Education and career

Ekhard Salje completed his University Teacher’s Dissertation in 1972, and by 1983 was the Head of Department at the Institute for Crystallography and Petrology at the Leibniz University Hannover. In 1985 he moved to Cambridge where was awarded a Professorship in Mineral Physics in the Department of Earth Sciences in 1992. He worked jointly  in the Department of Physics Cavendish Laboratory.  

In 1998 he assumed the post of Head of Department of Earth Sciences, University of Cambridge, which he retained until October 2008.

In October 2001 he became President of Clare Hall, a post he held until 2008 when he was succeeded by Sir Martin Harris.

Research
Professor Salje's research is focused in the field of mineralogy and mineral physics using approaches that combine theoretical and experimental methods. In particular, he is concerned with the stability of minerals and the transformation processes that occur within them in response to changes in temperature and pressure. His work includes the study of structural phase transitions, the formation of polaronic states in transition metal oxides like WO3, and ferroelasticity. The dynamics of phase transitions includes the movements of nano-domains which progress as avalanches in most cases. He  discovered avalanche behaviour by experiment and computer simulation in ferroelastics, ferroelectrics and martensitic alloys. His work in the field of mineral physics was rewarded in 1996 when he was  elected a Fellow of the Royal Society. This has been followed  by him being elected  Chevalier dans l’ordre des Palmes Academiques (France) in 2004 and awarded the Cross of the Order of Merit of the Federal Republic of Germany in 2007. He is fellow of the Leopoldina (Nat. Academy of Germany) and the Royal Society of the Arts and Sciences of Barcelona.

He is the co-author of the report by the Royal Society on nuclear waste and was chairman of the Steering Committee of the National Institute for Environmental e-Sciences. As Programme Director of the Cambridge-MIT Institute he was responsible for joint research in the field of Future Technologies. He was chairman of the Cambridge e-science Centre and chairman of the steering committee of the Cambridge Environmental Initiative (CEI) which advises on environmental research in Cambridge. He was president of the British branch of the Alexander von Humboldt Association. He was chairman of the Cambridge European Trust, member of the Wissenschaftsrat (Germany), Int. Advisory Board of the Alexander von Humboldt Foundation (Germany), and the Parliamentary Office for Science and Technology (UK).

Professor Salje has been visiting professor in Japan (mombusho chair), Max Planck Institute for Mathematics in the Sciences in Leipzig, Univers. Paris VI, Bilbao, Grenoble, Le Mans. He is hon. Professor at Xi'an Jiaotong University (China) and Ulam fellow at the Los Alamos National Laboratory.

Selected bibliography
He has published over 700 scientific papers and 3 books.His h-index is >80 (Google scholar)

Awards
 Fellow of Leopoldina (German Academy of Natural Sciences), 1994
 Abraham-Gottlob-Werner medal in mineralogy, 1994
 Fellow of the Royal Society, 1996
 Mombusho Professor, Institute of Physics and Geological Society, Japan, 1996
 Schlumberger medal of the Mineralogical Society, 1998
 Humboldt Research Prize, 2000
 Honorary Fellow of Darwin College, Cambridge, 2001
 Ernst Ising prize for Physics, 2002
 Gold medal of the University of Hamburg, 2002
 Chevalier dans l’ordre des Palmes Academiques, 2004
 Agricola medal for Applied Mineralogy, 2006
 Order of Merit of the Federal Republic of Germany, first class (Germany), 2006
 Foreign member of the Royal Soc. of Barcelona for Arts and Sciences, 2010
 Honorary Professor, Jiao-Tong University, China, 2012
 Werner Heisenberg medal 2017
 honorary PhD (Dr. h.c.) University of Wuerzburg, 2019
 Hon. Senator (Ehrensenator) University of Wuerzburg, 2020
 member Academia Europaea, 2021

References

External links
 Personal web page at the Department of Earth Sciences, University of Cambridge
 Presidents web page at Clare Hall
 CEI Profile page

1946 births
Fellows of Darwin College, Cambridge
Fellows of Clare Hall, Cambridge
Presidents of Clare Hall, Cambridge
Professorship of Mineralogy and Petrology (Cambridge)
Living people
Officers Crosses of the Order of Merit of the Federal Republic of Germany
Fellows of the Royal Society
Members of the German Academy of Sciences Leopoldina